NTPC Kawas is located at Aditya Nagar, Hazira in Surat district in the Indian state of Gujarat. The power plant is the gas-based combined cycle power plants of NTPC. The gas for the power plant is sourced from GAIL HBJ Pipeline – South Basin Gas field. Source of water for the power plant is Hazira Branch Canal Singanpur Weir.

Capacity

References

Natural gas-fired power stations in Gujarat
Surat district
1992 establishments in Gujarat
Energy infrastructure completed in 1992